Kevin Brock may refer to:
Kevin Brock (footballer) (born 1962), English former footballer
Kevin Brock (American football) (born 1986), American football tight end